Aljaž Bedene (born 18 July 1989) is a Slovenian former professional tennis player. He was a naturalised Briton and played with this nationality from 2015 to 2017, returning to represent Slovenia in 2018.

Bedene has won six Futures and 16 Challenger singles titles. In doubles he has won one Challenger title and two Futures titles. His highest ranking is No. 43 in singles (achieved on 19 February 2018) and No. 127 in doubles (achieved on 7 October 2013).

Bedene represented Slovenia when he turned pro in 2008. On 31 March 2015, he was granted UK citizenship and represented Great Britain, but the International Tennis Federation has rejected his application to represent Great Britain in the Davis Cup as he had previously played three dead rubbers for Slovenia. After his appeals failed, Bedene switched his representation back to his birth country of Slovenia for the 2018 season.

Early and personal life
Bedene's father, Branko, is a dental industry worker and his mother, Darlen, works for the Ministry of Defence. Aljaž and his younger twin brother, Andraž used to compete for Slovenia's top tennis honours. The two met regularly in competition finals. His nickname is Ali or Benke, and he speaks English, Slovenian and Croatian. Andraž Bedene is a former ATP tour player.

In 2008, Aljaž made the decision to pursue his tennis career in the UK because he felt it was stagnating under the limitations he encountered in Slovenia. He ended a seven-year wait to become a British citizen on 26 March 2015 and became British no. 2 behind Andy Murray.

Aljaž has lived in Welwyn Garden City since 2008 with his girlfriend, pop star Kimalie, formerly part of the Slovenian group Foxy Teens. Bedene was based at the Global Tennis Connections Academy in Gosling.

In January 2018 Bedene began representing his birth nation of Slovenia again.

Career

2011: ATP debut
Not counting the Davis Cup competition, he competed in his first ATP tournament at Erste Bank Open in Vienna, Austria. He reached the second round where he lost in three sets against Tommy Haas.

2012: Four Challenger titles, top 100 debut
Bedene made his first ATP quarterfinal appearance at the Erste Bank Open. In the quarterfinal he played against no. 2 seed Janko Tipsarević and lost after retiring in the second set.

He made his top 100 debut at World No. 83 on 30 July 2012 following his fourth title at the 2012 ATP China Challenger International.

2013: Grand Slam debut
Bedene made his first ATP semifinal appearance at the Aircel Chennai Open defeating the no. 6 seed Robin Haase in the second round and the no. 4 seed Stanislas Wawrinka in the quarterfinals. In the semifinal, he lost against no. 2 seed Janko Tipsarević.

At the Australian Open he played in his first Grand Slam tournament. He lost in the first round to Benjamin Becker.

2014: First Masters 1000 third round in Miami
On 9 May, it was announced that Bedene had applied for a British passport, with legal support from the Lawn Tennis Association.

2015: First ATP final, Top 50 debut
Starting the year in 2015 Aircel Chennai Open, Bedene reached the finals by defeating Lukáš Lacko, Feliciano López, Guillermo García López, and Roberto Bautista Agut in three sets. He lost the final to Stan Wawrinka in straight sets.

On 26 March, Bedene, the world no 83, was granted UK citizenship. Bedene said he planned to appeal against a new rule which prevents players from representing more than one country in Davis Cup. Bedene played three dead rubbers for Slovenia in Davis Cup action in 2010, 2011 and 2012.

On 30 May, the International Tennis Federation announced that Bedene would not be allowed to represent Great Britain in the Davis Cup in response to the Lawn Tennis Association who had appealed against a rule brought in on 1 January, forbidding players from representing two nations in the competition. Bedene's case had been based on his passport application being submitted before the new regulation was implemented. On 17 November, Bedene and representatives from the Lawn Tennis Association flew to Prague to appeal for the right of Bedene to play Davis Cup for Great Britain. However, the Lawn Tennis Association did not submit a 70-page summary of its support for the player until just before the meeting. The International Tennis Federation said the hearing of the appeal would be adjourned until the next board meeting on 20–21 March 2016, so it could consider the document.

He made his top 50 debut on 19 October 2015.

2016: First Major third round at the French Open
The International Tennis Federation, which was meeting in Moldova on 20 March, considered Bedene's appeal to represent Great Britain in Davis Cup. The International Tennis Federation decided that Bedene was not eligible to represent Great Britain in Davis Cup or the Olympics. Bedene decided to consider seeking a ruling from the Court of Arbitration for Sport.

In March, he split from his coach James Davidson, and Davis Cup captain Leon Smith supervised him at the French Open. Bedene progressed to the third round of a Grand Slam for the first time, where he was beaten by Novak Djokovic.

2017: Second Major third round and ATP final
In March, Bedene won the Irving Tennis Classic, defeating Mikhail Kukushkin in the final in three sets, before going on in April to win the 2017 Verrazzano Open defeating Benoît Paire in two sets in the final and then the 2017 Open Città della Disfida defeating Gastão Elias, also in two sets. Also in April, Bedene reached the Gazprom Hungarian Open final, where he lost to Lucas Pouille in two sets.

2018: Third ATP final, Career-high ranking
Bedene, representing Slovenia again, reached the finals of the Argentina Open in February, defeating Jiří Veselý, Albert Ramos Viñolas, Diego Schwartzman, and Federico Delbonis before losing to Dominic Thiem. As a result he reached a new career-high of World No. 43 in singles on 19 February 2018.

2019: US Open third round

2020: First Australian Open win

2021: Wimbledon third round
Bedene started his 2021 season at the first edition of the Great Ocean Road Open. Seeded 13th, he reached the third round and lost to fourth seed and eventual champion, Jannik Sinner. At the Australian Open, he was defeated in the first round by Alexander Bublik.

In Montpellier, Bedene upset fifth seed, Jannik Sinner, in the first round. He was eliminated in the second round by Egor Gerasimov. At the Dubai Championships, he was beaten in the third round by Kei Nishikori. He lost in the second round of the Miami Open to 28th seed Kei Nishikori.

Starting his clay-court season at the Sardegna Open, Bedene made it to the quarterfinals where he fell to second seed Taylor Fritz. In Belgrade, he beat rising American star, Sebastian Korda, in the first round in three sets. He was defeated in the second round by third seed and eventual finalist, Aslan Karatsev, despite having match point at 6–5 in the third set. At the Italian Open, he was eliminated in the final round of qualifying by Hugo Dellien. However, due to the withdrawal of Casper Ruud, Bedene received entry into the main draw as a lucky loser. He was beaten in the first round by Jan-Lennard Struff. After Rome, he competed at the Lyon Open. He upset fourth seed, David Goffin, in the second round. He lost in the quarterfinals to Italian rising star Lorenzo Musetti. Seeded seventh at the first edition of the Emilia-Romagna Open in Parma, he was defeated in the second round by Italian wildcard and eventual finalist, Marco Cecchinato. Ranked 56 at the French Open, he lost in the second round to 10th seed Diego Schwartzman.

Starting his grass-court season at the Queen's Club Championships, Bedene was defeated in the first round by American Frances Tiafoe. In Eastbourne, he was eliminated in the first round by Márton Fucsovics in three sets. Ranked 64 at Wimbledon, he reached the third round for a second time in his career at this Major where he lost to seventh seed and eventual finalist, Matteo Berrettini.

Seeded fifth at the Croatia Open, Bedene lost in the first round to Marco Cecchinato.

2022: Third French Open third round, retirement 
At the 2022 French Open he used his protected ranking after coming back from an eight-month hiatus and reached the third round for the third time in his career at this Grand Slam. He lost to top seed Novak Djokovic.
He announced that he would retire at the end of the season after the Slovenia's Davis Cup tie to become a soccer agent.

Performance timelines

Singles

Doubles

ATP career finals

Singles: 4 (4 runner-ups)

Challenger and Futures Finals

Singles: 27 (21–6)

Doubles: 7 (3–4)

Wins over top 10 players

Davis Cup

Singles performances (9–1)

Doubles performances (2–2)

References

External links 

 
 
 

Slovenian male tennis players
British male tennis players
Living people
1989 births
Sportspeople from Ljubljana
Slovenian twins
Twin sportspeople
Slovenian emigrants to the United Kingdom
Tennis people from Greater London
Naturalised citizens of the United Kingdom